Shruti in Sanskrit means "that which is heard" and refers to the body of most authoritative, ancient religious texts comprising the central canon of Hinduism. Manusmriti states:  Śrutistu vedo vijñeyaḥ (Sanskrit: श्रुतिस्तु वेदो विज्ञेय:) meaning, "Know that Vedas are Śruti". Thus, it includes the four Vedas including its four types of embedded texts—the Samhitas,  the Upanishads, the Brahmanas and the Aranyakas. 

Śrutis have been variously described as a revelation through anubhava (direct experience), or of primordial origins realized by ancient Rishis. In Hindu tradition, they have been referred to as apauruṣeya (not created by humans). 

All six schools of Hinduism accept the authority of śruti, but many scholars in these schools have denied that the śrutis are divine. A popular quote on supreme authority is Śruti can be found in Manusmriti (Adhyaya 1, Mantra 132) that Dharma jijñāsamānam pramāṇam paramam śrutih (Sanskrit: धर्मं जिज्ञासमानानां प्रमाणं परमं श्रुतिः, lit. means "To those who seek the knowledge of the sacred law, the supreme authority is the revelation Śruti.

Shruti (Śruti) differs from other sources of Hindu philosophy, particularly smṛti  "which is remembered" or textual material. These works span much of the history of Hinduism, beginning with the earliest known texts and ending in the early historical period with the later Upanishads. Of the śrutis, the Upanishads alone are widely known, and the central ideas of the Upanishadic śrutis are at the spiritual core of Hindus.

Etymology
The Sanskrit word "" has multiple meanings depending on context. It means "hearing, listening", a call to "listen to a speech", any form of communication that is aggregate of sounds (news, report, rumour, noise, hearsay). The word is also found in ancient geometry texts of India, where it means "the diagonal of a tetragon or hypotenuse of a triangle", and is a synonym of karna. The word śruti is also found in ancient Indian music literature, where it means "a particular division of the octave, a quarter tone or interval" out of twenty-two enumerated major tones, minor tones, and semitones. In music, it refers the smallest measure of sound a human being can detect, and the set of twenty-two śruti and forty four half Shruti, stretching from about 250 Hz to 500 Hz, is called the Shruti octave.

In scholarly works on Hinduism, śruti refers to ancient Vedic texts from India. Monier-Williams traces the contextual history of this meaning of śruti as, "which has been heard or communicated from the beginning, sacred knowledge that was only heard and verbally transmitted from generation to generation, the Veda, from earliest Rishis (sages) in Vedic tradition. In scholarly literature, Śruti is also spelled as Shruti.

Distinction between śruti and smṛti
Smriti literally "that which is remembered," refers to a body of Hindu texts usually attributed to an author, traditionally written down but constantly revised, in contrast to Śrutis (the Vedic literature) considered authorless, that were transmitted verbally across the generations and fixed. Smriti is a derivative secondary work and is considered less authoritative than Śruti in Hinduism. Śruti are fixed and its originals preserved better, while each Smriti text exists in many versions, with many different readings. Smritis were considered fluid and freely rewritten by anyone in ancient and medieval Hindu tradition.

Both śrutis and smṛtis represent categories of texts of different traditions of Hindu philosophy. According to Gokul Narang, the Sruti are asserted to be of divine origin in the mythologies of the Puranas. For the people living during the composition of the Vedas the names of the authors were well known. Ancient and medieval Hindu philosophers also did not think that śruti were divine, authored by God.

That Vedas were heard was a notion that was developed by the school or darsana of Pūrva-Mīmāṃsā. The Mīmāṃsā tradition, famous in Hindu tradition for its Sruti exegetical contributions, radically critiqued the notion and any relevance for concepts such as "author", the "sacred text" or divine origins of Śruti; the Mimamsa school claimed that the relevant question is the meaning of the Sruti, values appropriate for human beings in it, and the commitment to it.

Nāstika philosophical schools such as the Cārvākas of the first millennium BCE did not accept the authority of the śrutis and considered them to be human works suffering from incoherent rhapsodies, inconsistencies and tautologies.

Smṛtis are to be human thoughts in response to the śrutis. Traditionally, all smṛtis are regarded to ultimately be rooted in or inspired by śrutis.

Texts
The śruti literature include the four Vedas:

Rigveda
Yajurveda
Samaveda
Atharvaveda

Each of these Vedas include the following texts, and these belong to the śruti canon:

Samhitas
Brahmanas
Aranyakas
Upanishads

The literature of the shakhas, or schools, further amplified the material associated with each of the four core traditions.

Of the above śrutis, the Upanishads are most widely known, and the central ideas of them are the spiritual foundation of Hinduism. Patrick Olivelle writes,

Role in Hindu Law
Shrutis have been considered the authority in Hinduism. Smṛtis, including the Manusmṛti, the Nāradasmṛti and the Parāśarasmṛti, are considered less authoritative than śrutis.

Only three of the four types of texts in the Vedas have behavioral precepts:

Bilimoria states the role of śruti in Hinduism has been inspired by "the belief in a higher natural cosmic order (Rta succeeded later by the concept Dharma) that regulates the universe and provides the basis for its growth, flourishing and sustenance – be that of the gods, human beings, animals and eco-formations".

Levinson states that the role of śruti and smṛti in Hindu law is as a source of guidance, and its tradition cultivates the principle that "the facts and circumstances of any particular case determine what is good or bad". The later Hindu texts include fourfold sources of dharma, states Levinson, which include atmanastushti (satisfaction of one's conscience), sadacara (local norms of virtuous individuals), smṛti and śruti.

Transmission
The śrutis, the oldest of which trace back to the second millennium BCE, had not been committed to writing in ancient times. These were developed and transmitted verbally, from one generation to the next, for nearly two millenniums. Almost all printed editions available in the modern era are copied manuscripts that are hardly older than 500 years. Michael Witzel explains this oral tradition as follows:

Ancient Indians developed techniques for listening, memorization and recitation of śrutis. Many forms of recitation or pathas were designed to aid accuracy in recitation and the transmission of the Vedas and other knowledge texts from one generation to the next. All hymns in each Veda were recited in this way; for example, all 1,028 hymns with 10,600 verses of the Rigveda was preserved in this way; as were all other Vedas including the Principal Upanishads, as well as the Vedangas. Each text was recited in a number of ways, to ensure that the different methods of recitation acted as a cross check on the other. Pierre-Sylvain Filliozat summarizes this as follows:
 Samhita-patha: continuous recitation of Sanskrit words bound by the phonetic rules of euphonic combination;
 Pada-patha: a recitation marked by a conscious pause after every word, and after any special grammatical codes embedded inside the text; this method suppresses euphonic combination and restores each word in its original intended form;
 Krama-patha: a step-by-step recitation where euphonically-combined words are paired successively and sequentially and then recited; for example, a hymn "word1 word2 word3 word4...", would be recited as "word1word2 word2word3 word3word4 ...."; this method to verify accuracy is credited to Vedic sages Gargya and Sakalya in the Hindu tradition and mentioned by the ancient Sanskrit grammarian Panini (dated to pre-Buddhism period);
 Krama-patha modified: the same step-by-step recitation as above, but without euphonic-combinations (or free form of each word); this method to verify accuracy is credited to Vedic sages Babhravya and Galava in the Hindu tradition, and is also mentioned by the ancient Sanskrit grammarian Panini;

These extraordinary retention techniques guaranteed an accurate Śruti, fixed across the generations, not just in terms of unaltered word order but also in terms of sound.

This part of a Vedic student's education was called svādhyāya. The systematic method of learning, memorization and practice, enabled these texts to be transmitted from generation to generation with inordinate fidelity.

See also
Hindu law
Upanishads
Vedas
Śāstra pramāṇam in Hinduism

Notes

References

Cited sources
Coburn, Thomas, B.  Scripture" in India: Towards a Typology of the Word in Hindu Life Journal of the American Academy of Religion, Vol. 52, No. 3 (Sep., 1984),
Clooney, Francis X. Why the Veda Has No Author: Language as Ritual in Early Mīmāṃsā and Post-Modern TheologyJournal of the American Academy of Religion, Vol. 55, No. 4 (Winter, 1987).
Jho, Chakradhar. 1987. History and Sources of Law in Ancient India Ashish Publishing House.
Flood, Gavin. 1997. An Introduction to Hinduism. Cambridge University Press
Gupta, Ravi M. 2007. Caitanya Vaisnava Vedanta of Jiva Gosvami.

External links and further reading
Shruti and other texts (Incomplete), Wikisource
Upanishads (in Sanskrit, complete list of 108) Wikisource
Shruti in Hinduism, University of Pittsburgh
Hindu Scriptures, Berkley Center for Religion, Peace & World, Georgetown University
Introduction to the Role of Śruti in Hindu Theology, Francis X. Clooney (2014), Journal of Hindu Studies, Vol. 7, No. 1, pages 1–5

Revelation
Hindu texts
Sanskrit words and phrases